The 1990s economic boom in the United States was an economic expansion that began after the end of the early 1990s recession in March 1991, and ended in March 2001 with the start of the early 2000s recession during the Dot-com bubble crash (2000–2002). It was the longest recorded economic expansion in the history of the United States until July 2019.

Background 
The 1990s were remembered as a time of strong economic growth, steady job creation, low inflation, rising productivity, economic boom, and a surging stock market that resulted from a combination of rapid technological changes and sound central monetary policy.

The prosperity of the 1990s was not evenly distributed over the entire decade. The economy was in recession from July 1990 - March 1991, having suffered the S&L Crisis in 1989, a spike in gas prices as the result of the Gulf War, and the general run of the business cycle since 1983. A surge in inflation in 1988 and 1989 forced the Federal Reserve to raise the discount rate to 8.00% in early 1990, restricting credit into the already-weakening economy. GDP growth and job creation remained weak through late-1992. Unemployment rose from 5.4% in January 1990 to 6.8% in March 1991, and continued to rise until peaking at 7.8% in June 1992. Approximately 1.621 million jobs were shed during the recession. As inflation subsided drastically, the Federal Reserve cut interest rates to a then-record low of 3.00% to promote growth.

For the first time since the Great Depression, the economy underwent a "jobless recovery," where GDP growth and corporate earnings returned to normal levels while job creation lagged, demonstrating the importance of the financial and service sectors in the national economy, having surpassed the manufacturing sector in the 1980s.

Politically, the stagnant economy would doom President George H. W. Bush in the 1992 election, as Bill Clinton capitalized on economic frustration and voter fatigue after 12 years of Republican stewardship of the White House. Unemployment remained above 7% until July 1993, and above 6% until September 1994.

It was in the spring of 1994 where GDP growth surged and the number of jobs created (3.85 million) set a record that has yet to be surpassed as of 2015. But 1995 would bring a pause in economic growth, primarily because the Federal Reserve raised interest rates from 3% to 6% beginning in late 1994 to prevent inflation from rising after such rapid growth along with two government shutdowns that slowed the economy. The pause was short-lived, however, as the economy adjusted and the surge of investment in the Dot-Com bubble would jumpstart the economy beginning in late 1995. 1996 saw a return to steady growth, and in May 1997 unemployment fell below 5% for the first time since December 1973.

This prosperity, combined with the Omnibus Budget Reconciliation Act of 1990 and Omnibus Budget Reconciliation Act of 1993 (which raised taxes and restrained spending), allowed the federal government to go from a $290 billion deficit in 1992 to a record $236.4 billion surplus in 2000. The reduction in government borrowing freed up capital in markets for businesses and consumers, causing interest rates on loans to fall creating a cycle that only reinforced growth. Government debt increased from $5.02 trillion in 1990 to $5.413 in 1997 and flatlined, barely increasing to $5.674 in 2000.

1995–2000 is also remembered for a series of global economic financial crises that threatened the U.S. economy: Mexico in 1995, Asia in 1997, Russia in 1998, and Argentina in 1999. Despite occasional stock market downturns and some distortions in the trade deficit, the US economy remained resilient until the dot-com bubble peaked in March 2001. The Federal Reserve had a hand in propping up the US economy by lowering interest rates to 4.75% by November 1998 to flood the world financial markets with dollars and prevent a global economic crisis as well as to restore confidence within the American economy which panicked during the height of the Asian financial crisis in 1997.

The easing of credit also coincided with spectacular stock market run-ups from 1999 to 2000. The NASDAQ, at less than 800 points in 1994, surged to over 5,000 in March 2000. The Dow Jones Industrial Index traded at roughly 3,000 points in 1990 and 4,000 in 1995, nearly tripled to over 11,000 by mid-2000.

Proposed reasons for the boom 

Possible reasons for the economic boom:

The mid to late 1990s was characterized by significantly low oil prices (the lowest prices since the post-World War 2 economic boom), which would have reduced transportation and manufacturing costs, leading to increases in economic growth. The lowest price for oil during this entire period occurred in 1998.
Reform of welfare enacted through the Personal Responsibility and Work Opportunity Act, which significantly reduced the amount of time individuals can stay on welfare and as a result, increased the labor force participation rate. Labor Force Participation Rates climbed to its highest level before starting to descend in the mid-2000s. Workfare was gaining more credibility among OECD nations during this time.
A more egalitarian tax structure, and the accompanying promotion of Third Way politics espoused by Clinton and Tony Blair, which emphasizes a syncretic form of neoliberal politics along with slight improvements in social capital which aims to give the poor a "hand up" (not a handout), instead of relying on purely laissez faire policies and the purely leftist strains associated with the welfare state.
New job growth created from the information revolution and the associated capital created from the dot com bubble.
The enactment of NAFTA was thought to increase economic growth via improved comparative advantage, which reduced prices for traded goods.
Increased productivity created from newly invented information technologies (computers; internet)
 A healthy dependency ratio when Baby Boomers were still working.
 A higher savings rate and thus more available credit and investment.
The new generational bulge of Millennials (albeit less pronounced than the Baby Boomer generational bulge) would create a significant market dedicated for young people during this decade, increasing demand and consumer spending. This bulge was apparent in the early 1990s, when more Millennials were born.

None of these rationales for the 1990s economic boom should be seen as mutually exclusive.

End of the boom 
Despite the concerns, it was during this time that talk of a "New Economy" emerged, where inflation and unemployment were low and strong growth coincided. Some even spoke of the end of the business cycle, where economic growth was perpetual. In April 2000, unemployment dropped to 3.8%, and was below 4% September–December 2000. For the whole 1990-2000 period, roughly 23,672,000 jobs were created. Hourly wages had increased by a strong 10.1% since 1996. But by the fall, the economy began to run out of steam. The Federal Reserve hiked rates to 6.5% in May 2000, and it appeared by late-2000 that the business cycle was not eliminated, but was coming to a crest. Growth faltered, job creation slowed, the stock markets plunged, and the groundwork for the 2001 recession was being laid, thus ending the economic boom of the 1990s.

Legacy 
According to the National Bureau of Economic Research, the 1990s was the longest economic expansion in the history of the United States until the 2009-2020 expansion, lasting exactly ten years from March 1991 to March 2001. It was the best performance on all accounts since the 1961-1969 period. The importance and influence of the financial sector only grew, as demonstrated by the bursting of the Dot-Com Bubble in 2000 followed by a recession in 2001. The effects of the early-2000s recession would continue to be felt through the end of 2003.

See also
 Californian Ideology
 Post-World War II economic boom
 Technoutopianism

Contemporary economics
 New Economy
 The Great Moderation
 Dot-com bubble

Contemporary booms
 Baltic Tiger, shortly following
 Celtic Tiger, Ireland
 Miracle of Chile

References

Philip Armstrong, Andrew Glyn & John Harrison, Capitalism since World War II. The making and breakup of the great boom. 1st edition Fontana 1984, 2nd edition Blackwell 1991. (provides extensive bibliography)
 Business Cycle Expansions and Contractions (List of NBER Recessions)

Economic booms
1990s economic history
1990s in the United States
Business cycles in the United States